Hirskyi Tikych is a river in Ukraine, 167 km in length, a tributary of the Tikych, in the basin of Southern Bug. The Hirskyi Tikych river finds its source near the village of Frontivka in Orativ Raion, Vinnytsia Oblast.  It joins the 157 km long Hnylyi Tikych to form the Tikych, which soon joins the Velyka Vys river to form the Syniukha river, which flows 110 km to join the Southern Bug.

References
 Географічна енциклопедія України: в 3-х томах / Редколегія: О. М. Маринич (відпов. ред.) та ін. — К.: «Українська радянська енциклопедія» імені М. П. Бажана, 1989.

Rivers of Vinnytsia Oblast
Rivers of Cherkasy Oblast